The 2013–14 Florida Gators men's basketball team represented the University of Florida in the sport of basketball during the 2013–14 college basketball season. The Gators competed in Division I of the National Collegiate Athletic Association (NCAA) and the Southeastern Conference (SEC). They were led by head coach Billy Donovan, and played their home games in the O'Connell Center on the university's Gainesville, Florida campus.

The Gators finished the SEC regular season with an 18–0 record in conference play, the first SEC team to ever accomplish the feat, after the SEC re-expanded to an 18-game regular season schedule prior to the 2012–13 season.  In doing so, the Gators won their seventh SEC regular season championship, and their third in four seasons. The Gators beat the Kentucky Wildcats 61–60 to claim the fourth SEC Tournament championship title.

By claiming the SEC tournament, the Gators earned an automatic bid to the NCAA tournament, and were selected as the #1 overall seed, and were placed in the South Regional.  The Gators defeated all of their first four opponents by at least 10 points and advanced to the Final Four as the only #1 seed remaining.  At that point, the Gators had a school record winning streak of 30 wins, dating back to Dec. 2, 2013, where the Gators lost in a tight game at UConn 64–65.  The Gators' semifinal opponent was a rematch against UConn, who had won the East Regional.  The Gators got off to a quick start; however, the Huskies were able to catch up and led at halftime.  In the second half, the Gators fell farther behind, giving up numerous turnovers, and missing numerous field goals.  The Gators eventually suffered only their third (and worst) loss of the season to eventual national champion UConn once again, 63–53, and ended the heavily-favored Gators' hopes at earning a third national championship.

Roster

NOTES
 Prior to the season, sophomore guard Braxton Ogbueze transferred to Charlotte.

Coaches

Team statistics 
As of April 5, 2014. 
 Indicates team leader in specific category. (FG% leader = minimum 100 att.; 3P% leader = minimum 20 att.; FT% leader = minimum 50 att.)
Retrieved from Gatorzone.com

Schedule and results

|-
!colspan=9| Exhibition

|-
!colspan=9| Regular season (non-conference play)

|-
!colspan=9| Regular season (SEC conference play)

|-
!colspan=9| SEC tournament

|-
!colspan=9| NCAA tournament

Source:

Rankings

References

External links
 Men's Basketball at GatorZone.com

Florida Gators men's basketball seasons
Florida
Florida
Florida Gators men's basketball team
Florida Gators men's basketball team
NCAA Division I men's basketball tournament Final Four seasons